Brignoni, an Italian family name, can refer to: 
Jonas Brignoni Dos Santos (1983–), a Brazilian footballer
Luis Brignoni (1953–), a Puerto Rican basketballer
Nicolas Brignoni (1976–), a former Uruguayan rugby union player
Serge Brignoni (1903–2002), a Swiss painter and sculptor
United States v. Brignoni-Ponce, a 1975 court case